Sucré is an indie pop band formed by vocalist Stacy King, formerly of Eisley. Her husband, Darren King, produces the music along with multi-instrumentalist and arranger Jeremy Larson. Sucré was formed in 2011 and started touring in 2012. Their first single, "When We Were Young", debuted in early 2012, and their debut album, A Minor Bird, was released on April 10, 2012. The album was released streaming on HelloGiggles on April 9, 2012.

For Valentine's Day 2014, Sucré premiered a music video of "You and Me" (made famous from the Ryan Gosling and Michelle Williams film Blue Valentine) with Nylon magazine. "It's intimate and catchy," Nylon said of King and company's interpretation of the tune.

On August 25, 2014, Sucré released the first original recording in two years with "Young and Free."

History
The first music by Sucré released was a cover of Fleetwood Mac's "Silver Spring" in 2010. She played their first show February 6, 2012 in Los Angeles at The Hotel Cafe  and have done a few shows prior including Webster Hall in New York City and Bootleg Theater in Los Angeles. In October 2012, Stacy and husband Darren had a daughter named Scarlett.

Recent Events
Sucré embarked on the first-ever tour shortly after the release of Loner performing throughout the midwest and east coast. Sucré headlined shows at Stubb's Jr in Austin and the Marlin Room at Webster Hall
 during this tour.

Discography

Studio albums
A Minor Bird (2012)

Eps
Loner (2014)
In Pieces (2019)

Singles
"Silver Springs" (2010)
"When We Were Young" (2012)
"Inside" (2018)
"Roof" (2019)
"Retribution" (2019)
"Put Down Your Guns" (2019)
"Devil Land" (2019)
"Truth or Dare" (2019)
"Your Records" (2019)
"Emo" (2019)
"Why Aren't We Happy" (2019)
"Permission" (2021)
"Never" (2021)
”Gemini” (2022)

Notes

External links
Official Website
Facebook
iTunes

American indie pop musicians
Indie pop groups from Texas